The New Zealand cricket team toured Pakistan in December 2022 and January 2023 to play two Test matches and three One Day International (ODI) matches. The Test matches formed part of the 2021–2023 ICC World Test Championship, and the ODI matches formed part of the inaugural 2020–2023 ICC Cricket World Cup Super League. 

In April 2022, the Pakistan Cricket Board (PCB) confirmed that the series would be taking place. Following the tour, New Zealand are scheduled to return to Pakistan in April 2023, to play five ODIs and five Twenty20 International (T20I) matches, to make up for the series that was postponed in September 2021.

In October 2022, the PCB announced the fixtures for the tour. Initially, the second Test was scheduled to be played in Multan, but later shifted to Karachi because of poor weather conditions in Multan. On 24 December 2022, the PCB confirmed the revised fixtures, with all the matches being played in Karachi.

Ahead of the Test series, Tim Southee was appointed as New Zealand's Test captain,  after Kane Williamson stepped down from his role.

Squads

On 24 December 2022, Mir Hamza, Sajid Khan and Shahnawaz Dahani were added to Pakistan's Test squad.

New Zealand's Adam Milne and Matt Henry were ruled out from ODI series due to injuries, with Blair Tickner and Doug Bracewell named as their respective replacements.

Test series

1st Test

2nd Test

ODI series

1st ODI

2nd ODI

3rd ODI

References

External links
 Series home at ESPNcricinfo

2022 in Pakistani cricket
2023 in Pakistani cricket
2022 in New Zealand cricket
2023 in New Zealand cricket
International cricket competitions in 2022–23
New Zealand cricket tours of Pakistan
December 2022 events in Pakistan
January 2023 events in Pakistan